Sa Ty (born 4 April 2001) is a Cambodian footballer currently playing as a striker for Visakha in the Cambodian Premier League and the Cambodia national team.

International goals

U23

References

External links
 

2001 births
Living people
Cambodian footballers
Cambodia international footballers
Association football forwards
People from Kampong Chhnang province
Competitors at the 2021 Southeast Asian Games
Southeast Asian Games competitors for Cambodia
Visakha FC players
Cambodian Premier League players